This is a comprehensive index of city-building games, sorted chronologically. Information regarding date of release, developer, platform, setting and notability is provided when available. The table can be sorted by clicking on the small boxes next to the column headings.

Legend

List

See also
List of business simulation video games
List of roller coaster related video games
List of simulation video games

References

Timelines of video games
City-building games